The 2014 Channel O Music Video Awards took place on 29 November 2014 at the Nasrec Expo Centre in Soweto. Nominees were announced on 4 September. Cassper Nyovest, K.O and Davido led the nominations with 5 each. DJ Clock's hit song "Pluto", which features the singing trio Beatenberg, followed with 4. AKA and Uhuru both received three nominations apiece. Cassper Nyovest and Diamond Platnumz both took home three awards apiece.

Performers
Davido
Cassper Nyovest
K.O
AKA
Kwesta
Patoranking
Bucie
Riky Rick
Lil Kesh
Olamide
DJ Dimplez

Winners and nominees

Male  
Cassper Nyovest - "Doc Shebeleza" 
Davido - "Aye"
Riky Rick featuring Okmalumkoolkat - Amantombazane
K.O featuring Kid X - "Caracara"  
Sarkodie - "Illuminati"

Female  
Tiwa Savage featuring Don Jazzy - "Eminado"  
Thembi Seete - "Thuntsha Lerole"  
Bucie featuring Heavy K - "Easy To Love"  
Lizha James featuring Uhuru - "Quem Ti Mandou" 
Seyi Shay - "Irawo"

Newcomer 
Diamond Platnumz - "Number One" 
Dream Team featuring Tamarsha, AKA and Big Nuz - Tsekede (Remix)
Cassper Nyovest -  "Doc Shebeleza"  
Emmy Gee featuring AB Crazy and DJ Dimplez - "Rands and Nairas"  
Patoranking featuring Tiwa Savage - "Girlie O (Remix)"

Duo/Group or Featuring 
KCee featuring Wizkid - "Pull Over" 
Uhuru featuring Oskido and Professor - "Y-Tjukutja"  
DJ Clock featuring Beatenberg - "Pluto (I Remember)"  
R2Bees featuring Wizkid - "Slow Down"  
K.O featuring Kid X - "Caracara"

Dance  
Busiswa featuring Oskido and Uhuru - "Ngoku"
Uhuru featuring Oskido and Professor - "Y-Tjukutja"  
Davido - "Skelewu"
DJ Clock featuring Beatenberg - "Pluto (I Remember)" 
P-Square - "Personally"

Ragga Dancehall 
Buffalo Souljah - Turn Up  
Orezi - Rihanna"  
Jesse Jagz featuring Wizkid - "Bad Girl"  
Patoranking - Girlie O
Shatta Wale - "Everybody Likes My Ting"

Afro Pop 
Diamond Platnumz - "Number One"  
Davido - "Aye"  
Mafikizolo featuring May D - "Happiness"  
Flavour - "Ada Ada"  
Iyanya - "Jombolo"

Kwaito  
Uhuru featuring Oskido and Professor - "Y-Tjukutja"
Character featuring Mono T and Oskido - "Inxeba Lendoda" 
Big Nuz featuring Khaya Mthethwa - "Incwadi Yothando"  
DJ Vetkuk VS Mahoota - "Khaba Lenja"  
DJ Cndo - "Yamnandi Into"

R&B  
Donald - "Crazy But Amazing" 
2Face featuring T-Pain - "Rainbow"  
Jimmy Nevis featuring Kwesta - "Balloon"  
GB Collective featuring Brian Temba and Reason - "Chocolate Vanilla"  
Niyola - "Toh Bad"

Hip-hop
AKA - "Congratulate"
Cassper Nyovest - "Doc Shebeleza"
Khuli Chana featuring Da L.E.S and Magesh - "Hape Le Hape 2.1" 
Phyno - "Alobam"
K.O featuring Kid X - "Caracara"

Southern
Cassper Nyovest - "Doc Shebeleza" 
DJ Clock featuring Beatenberg - Pluto (I Remember)  
AKA - "Congratulate" 
Zeus - Psych  
K.O featuring Kid X - "Caracara"

West 
Olamide - "Turn Up"  
R2Bees featuring Wizkid - "Slow Down"
Davido - "Aye"  
Burna Boy featuring D'banj - "Won Da Mo"  
Dr SID featuring Don Jazzy - "Surulere"

East  
Diamond Platnumz - "Number One"
Sauti Sol - "Nshike"  
Navio - "No Holding Back"  
Eddy Kenzo - "Sitya Loss"  
Elani - "Kookoo"

Video of the Year
Cassper Nyovest - "Doc Shebeleza"
Emmy Gee featuring AB Crazy and DJ Dimplez - "Rands and Nairas" 
Davido - "Aye"
K.O featuring Kid X - "Caracara"
Burna Boy - "Run My Race"  
Tiwa Savage featuring Don Jazzy - "Eminado"  
Dr SID featuring Don Jazzy - "Surulere"  
Riky Rick featuring Okmalumkoolkat - "Amantombazane" 
Sarkodie - "Illuminati"  
DJ Clock featuring Beatenberg - Pluto (I Remember) 
AKA - "Congratulate"  
Diamond Platnumz - "Number One"

References

Channel O
Channel O